Carpocoris fuscispinus is a species of shield bug in the family Pentatomidae.

Subspecies
 Carpocoris fuscispinus hahni (Flor, 1856)
 Carpocoris fuscispinus incerta (Tamanini, 1959)
 Carpocoris fuscispinus maculosa (Tamanini, 1959)
 Carpocoris fuscispinus mediterranea (Tamanini, 1959)

Description
The basic colour of the body is quite variable, ranging from greyish yellow to reddish brown, with tiny black dots. It has a sharp angled pronotum, most prominent in the summer than in autumn. Antennae are black.

Ecology
Larvae are polyphagous, but they mainly occur on plants of the families Apiaceae and Asteraceae. Adults are commonly found from June to October. These shield bugs overwinter as adults.

Distribution and habitat
This species is widespread throughout Europe. It mainly occurs in deciduous and mixed forest areas.

Gallery

Bibliography
 Michael Chinery, Insectes de France et d'Europe occidentale, Paris, Flammarion,, pg. 74-75
 Metathoracic scent glands (MTGs) of Carpocoris fuscispinus (Boheman, 1851) (Heteroptera: Pentatomidae)

References
 Commanster
 BioLib
 Fauna Europaea

Pentatomidae
Insects described in 1851
Hemiptera of Europe